The name Michael was used for three tropical cyclones in the Atlantic Ocean.

 Hurricane Michael (2000) – Category 2 hurricane that caused moderate damage in Canada.
 Hurricane Michael (2012) – Category 3 hurricane that did not affect land.
 Hurricane Michael (2018) – Category 5 hurricane that formed near Central America, causing heavy flooding as it lingered over the area as a tropical depression, then rapidly intensified over the Gulf of Mexico making landfall in Florida at peak intensity. Michael caused about 74 fatalities and caused an estimated $25.1 billion (2018 USD) in damages.

After the 2018 season, the World Meteorological Organization retired the name Michael from its rotating name lists, and it will not be used again for an Atlantic hurricane. It will be replaced with Milton for the 2024 season.

See also
 Tropical Storm Mike, a weak 1950 tropical storm that went unnoticed until being discovered by reanalysis in 2014.

Atlantic hurricane set index articles